is a Japanese former professional baseball player. He was drafted in 2007 by the Hokkaido Nippon-Ham Fighters, but did not make his professional debut until 2013. He had 2 runs in 2013,

References

Living people
1989 births
Japanese baseball players
Nippon Professional Baseball outfielders
Hokkaido Nippon-Ham Fighters players